In ecology, niche differentiation (also known as niche segregation, niche separation and niche partitioning) refers to the process by which competing species use the environment differently in a way that helps them to coexist. The competitive exclusion principle states that if two species with identical niches (ecological roles) compete, then one will inevitably drive the other to extinction. This rule also states that two species cannot occupy the same exact niche in a habitat and coexist together, at least in a stable manner. When two species differentiate their niches, they tend to compete less strongly, and are thus more likely to coexist.  Species can differentiate their niches in many ways, such as by consuming different foods, or using different areas of the environment.

As an example of niche partitioning, several anole lizards in the Caribbean islands share common diets—mainly insects. They avoid competition by occupying different physical locations. Although these lizards might occupy different locations, some species can be found inhabiting the same range, with up to 15 in certain areas. For example, some live on the ground while others are arboreal. Species who live in different areas compete less for food and other resources, which minimizes competition between species.  However, species who live in similar areas typically compete with each other.

Detection and quantification 

The Lotka–Volterra equation states that two competing species can coexist when intra-specific (within species) competition is greater than inter-specific (between species) competition (Armstrong and McGehee 1981). Since niche differentiation concentrates competition within-species, due to a decrease in between-species competition, the Lotka-Volterra model predicts that niche differentiation of any degree will result in coexistence.

In reality, this still leaves the question of how much differentiation is needed for coexistence (Hutchinson 1959). A vague answer to this question is that the more similar two species are, the more finely balanced the suitability of their environment must be in order to allow coexistence. There are limits to the amount of niche differentiation required for coexistence, and this can vary with the type of resource, the nature of the environment, and the amount of variation both within and between the species. 
 
To answer questions about niche differentiation, it is necessary for ecologists to be able to detect, measure, and quantify the niches of different coexisting and competing species. This is often done through a combination of detailed ecological studies, controlled experiments (to determine the strength of competition), and mathematical models (Strong 1982, Leibold 1995). To understand the mechanisms of niche differentiation and competition, much data must be gathered on how the two species interact, how they use their resources, and the type of ecosystem in which they exist, among other factors. In addition, several mathematical models exist to quantify niche breadth, competition, and coexistence (Bastolla et al. 2005). However, regardless of methods used, niches and competition can be distinctly difficult to measure quantitatively, and this makes detection and demonstration of niche differentiation difficult and complex.

Development 

Over time, two competing species can either coexist, through niche differentiation or other means, or compete until one species becomes locally extinct.  Several theories exist for how niche differentiation arises or evolves given these two possible outcomes.

Current competition (The Ghost of Competition Present)

Niche differentiation can arise from current competition.  For instance, species X has a fundamental niche of the entire slope of a hillside, but its realized niche is only the top portion of the slope because species Y, which is a better competitor but cannot survive on the top portion of the slope, has excluded it from the lower portion of the slope.  With this scenario, competition will continue indefinitely in the middle of the slope between these two species.  Because of this, detection of the presence of niche differentiation (through competition) will be relatively easy.  Importantly, there is no evolutionary change of the individual species in this case; rather this is an ecological effect of species Y out-competing species X within the bounds of species Y's fundamental niche.

Via past extinctions (The Ghost of Competition Past)

Another way by which niche differentiation can arise is via the previous elimination of species without realized niches.  This asserts that at some point in the past, several species inhabited an area, and all of these species had overlapping fundamental niches.  However, through competitive exclusion, the less competitive species were eliminated, leaving only the species that were able to coexist (i.e. the most competitive species whose realized niches did not overlap).  Again, this process does not include any evolutionary change of individual species, but it is merely the product of the competitive exclusion principle.  Also, because no species is out-competing any other species in the final community, the presence of niche differentiation will be difficult or impossible to detect.

Evolving differences
Finally, niche differentiation can arise as an evolutionary effect of competition.  In this case, two competing species will evolve different patterns of resource use so as to avoid competition.  Here too, current competition is absent or low, and therefore detection of niche differentiation is difficult or impossible.

Types 

Below is a list of ways that species can partition their niche.  This list is not exhaustive, but illustrates several classic examples.

Resource partitioning

Resource partitioning is the phenomenon where two or more species divides out resources like food, space, resting sites etc. to coexist. For example, some lizard species appear to coexist because they consume insects of differing sizes.  Alternatively, species can coexist on the same resources if each species is limited by different resources, or differently able to capture resources.  Different types of phytoplankton can coexist when different species are differently limited by nitrogen, phosphorus, silicon, and light.  In the Galapagos Islands, finches with small beaks are more able to consume small seeds, and finches with large beaks are more able to consume large seeds.  If a species' density declines, then the food it most depends on will become more abundant (since there are so few individuals to consume it).  As a result, the remaining individuals will experience less competition for food.

Although "resource" generally refers to food, species can partition other non-consumable objects, such as parts of the habitat.  For example, warblers are thought to coexist because they nest in different parts of trees.  Species can also partition habitat in a way that gives them access to different types of resources.  As stated in the introduction, anole lizards appear to coexist because each uses different parts of the forests as perch locations.  This likely gives them access to different species of insects.

Research has determined that plants can recognize each others root systems and differentiate between a clone, a plant grown from the same mother plants seeds, and other species. Based on the root secretions, also called exudates, plants can make this determination. The communication between plants starts with the secretions from plant roots into the rhizosphere. If another plant that is kin is entering this area the plant will take up exudates. The exudate, being several different compounds, will enter the plants root cell and attach to a receptor for that chemical halting growth of the root meristem in that direction, if the interaction is kin.

Simonsen discusses how plants accomplish root communication with the addition of beneficial rhizobia and fungal networks and the potential for different genotypes of the kin plants, such as the legume M. Lupulina, and specific strains of nitrogen fixing bacteria and rhizomes can alter relationships between kin and non-kin competition. This means there could be specific subsets of genotypes in kin plants that selects well with specific strains that could outcompete other kin. What might seem like an instance in kin competition could just be different genotypes of organisms at play in the soil that increase the symbiotic efficiency.

Predator partitioning

Predator partitioning occurs when species are attacked differently by different predators (or natural enemies more generally).  For example, trees could differentiate their niche if they are consumed by different species of specialist herbivores, such as herbivorous insects.  If a species density declines, so too will the density of its natural enemies, giving it an advantage.  Thus, if each species is constrained by different natural enemies, they will be able to coexist.  Early work focused on specialist predators; however, more recent studies have shown that predators do not need to be pure specialists, they simply need to affect each prey species differently.  The Janzen–Connell hypothesis represents a form of predator partitioning.

Conditional differentiation
Conditional differentiation (sometimes called temporal niche partitioning) occurs when species differ in their competitive abilities based on varying environmental conditions. For example, in the Sonoran Desert, some annual plants are more successful during wet years, while others are more successful during dry years.  As a result, each species will have an advantage in some years, but not others.  When environmental conditions are most favorable, individuals will tend to compete most strongly with member of the same species.  For example, in a dry year, dry-adapted plants will tend to be most limited by other dry-adapted plants.  This can help them to coexist through a storage effect.

Competition-predation trade-off

Species can differentiate their niche via a competition-predation trade-off if one species is a better competitor when predators are absent, and the other is better when predators are present.  Defenses against predators, such as toxic compounds or hard shells, are often metabolically costly.  As a result, species that produce such defenses are often poor competitors when predators are absent.  Species can coexist through a competition-predation trade-off if predators are more abundant when the less defended species is common, and less abundant if the well-defended species is common.  This effect has been criticized as being weak, because theoretical models suggest that only two species within a community can coexist because of this mechanism.

Coexistence without niche differentiation: exceptions to the rule 

Some competing species have been shown to coexist on the same resource with no observable evidence of niche differentiation and in “violation” of the competitive exclusion principle.  One instance is in a group of hispine beetle species (Strong 1982).  These beetle species, which eat the same food and occupy the same habitat, coexist without any evidence of segregation or exclusion.  The beetles show no aggression either intra- or inter-specifically.  Coexistence may be possible through a combination of non-limiting food and habitat resources and high rates of predation and parasitism, though this has not been demonstrated. 
 
This example illustrates that the evidence for niche differentiation is by no means universal. Niche differentiation is also not the only means by which coexistence is possible between two competing species (see Shmida and Ellner 1984). However, niche differentiation is a critically important ecological idea which explains species coexistence, thus promoting the high biodiversity often seen in many of the world's biomes.

Research using mathematical modelling is indeed demonstrating that predation can indeed stabilize lumps of very similar species. Willow warbler and chiffchaff and other very similar warblers can serve as an example. The idea is that it is also a good strategy to be very similar to a successful species or have enough dissimilarity. Also trees in the rain forest can serve as an example of all high canopy species basically following the same strategy. Other examples of nearly identical species clusters occupying the same niche were water beetles, prairie birds and algae. The basic idea is that there can be clusters of very similar species all applying the same successful strategy and between them open spaces. Here the species cluster takes the place of a single species in the classical ecological models.

See also

 Phylogenetic niche conservatism

References

Further reading

External links 

Department of Entomology, University of Queensland, Australia.

Ecological niche